"Déjame gritar" ("Let me shout") is a pop/rock song performed by the Chilean band Kudai. It was released as the first single of their second album, Sobrevive 2006).

Music video
The music video was the last music video to feature old band member, Nicole Natalino. The song was re-released in August 2006, with Gabriela Villalba's voice to promote the re-release of the album and recording a new version of the video.

Charts

References

External links 
Kudai Official Site
EMI Music Mexico

2006 singles
Kudai songs
2006 songs
EMI Records singles